Nigamananda Bidyapitha(निगमानंद बिद्यापिठ) is an educational institution established in 1963 in Daulatabad, India. The place is near to Choudwar Municipal area and adjacent to Cuttack City. It is in the state of Orissa, India.

The school is named after the yogi Nigamananda (योगी निगमानंद). The school offers education to students of upper primary and secondary classes.

Other foundations named after yogi Nigamananda
Presently few foundations of Yoga, Education and Philosophy are running by Swami Nigamamanda followers in few places of India.

Yoga 

 Swami Nigamananda Saraswati Yoga Vidya Kendra, Chennai
 Nigamananda Education and Literature 
 Swami Nigamananda Ashram, Midnapur (WB)

Philosophy 

 Nigamananda Math, Halisahar

Education 

Institutions in Orissa
 Saraswata Bidyapitha, Biratunga
 Nigamananda Education Center, Ganjam (Orissa)
 Swami Nigamananda Educational Foundation, Bhubaneswar (Orissa)
 Thakur Nigamananda Mahavidyalaya, Barapara (Orissa) 
 Nigamananda Vidya Niketan, School, Cuttack (Orissa) 
 Nigamananda Bidyapitha, Daulatabad (Orissa)
Nigamananda High School, Balasore (Orissa).
Nigamananda Girls High School, Daulatabad (Orissa).
Nigamananda Bidyapitha, Cuttack (Orissa).
Nigamananda High School, Dhenkanal (Orissa).
Nigamananda Bidyapitha, Jajpur (Orissa).
Nigamananda U. Bidya Pitha, Kendrapara (Orissa).
Nigamananda Sans. Vidyalaya, Khurda (Orissa).
Nigamananda B.N.School, Khurda (Orissa).
Sri Sri Thakura Nigamananda High School, Puri (Orissa).
Nigamananda Ashram, Lokanath Road, Puri (Ashram) 

Institutions in West Bengal
 Nigamananda Mahavidyalaya (University), Midnapur (West Bengal) 
 Nigamananda Sebashram Higher Secondary School (West Bengal)
 Nigamananda High School, Kalna, (West Bengal) 
 Nigamananda Junior Training College, Coochbihar (West Bengal)
Sri Sri Nigamananda Adarsha Vidyniketan (Sr. 154), Jalpaiguri West Bengal.

References 

Schools in Odisha
Cuttack district
Educational institutions established in 1963
1963 establishments in Orissa